Shinola was a rock band from Chapel Hill, North Carolina, United States, that existed from 1994 to 1997, and was a regular mainstay in the burgeoning local indie-rock scene of the time. Employing two guitars, electrified violin, drums, bass guitar, and occasionally Farfisa organ and banjo, their sound drew simultaneously on country/folk and punk rock influences. The band brandished left-wing politics on its album art, website and flyers, but lyrically most of its songs focused on heartbreak.

They recorded the single "Vodka" (b/w "Who's a Fuck-up?") on Backporch Revolution, which was released it in 1996. The record was accorded a favorable review by Billboard Magazine and other periodicals. The band had over 30 songs, but never released a full-length album. A compilation of singles, demos, and live recordings was released after the band broke up in 1997.

External links
 Shinola on Backporch Revolution Records
 Shinola's original website (archived)

Alternative rock groups from North Carolina
Musical groups established in 1994
Musical groups disestablished in 1997
Musical groups from Chapel Hill-Carrboro, North Carolina